William Watkin Edward Wynne (23 December 1801 – 9 June 1880) was a Welsh Conservative Party politician and antiquarian.

Life
Wynne was born on 23 December 1801 in Denbighshire, Wales, and educated at Westminster School and Jesus College, Oxford. He married Mary Slaney, daughter of Robert Aglionby Slaney MP, and had a son named William Robert Maurice Wynne .

He was Conservative Member of Parliament (MP) for Merioneth from 1852 to 1865.  He also served as High Sheriff of Merionethshire in 1867 and became constable of Harlech Castle in 1874.

He inherited a collection of manuscripts in 1859, known as the Hengwrt collection, from his kinsman Sir Robert Vaughan, 2nd Baronet.  The collection had been assembled by the 17th-century antiquarian Robert Vaughan and it contained an early version of the Canterbury Tales, mystery plays in Cornish and many early Welsh manuscripts, including twelve manuscripts of the Welsh laws of Hywel Dda.  Wynne catalogued the manuscripts, publishing the result in Archaeologia Cambrensis between 1869 and 1871, and allowed scholars to examine and copy them.

Wynne had considerable knowledge about the history and genealogy of north Wales, assisting other writers and contributing articles on Merionethshire to Archaeologia Cambrensis and elsewhere.  He also wrote a history of Harlech Castle in 1878.  He died on 9 June 1880.

References

Sources

Books and Journals

1801 births
1880 deaths
Alumni of Jesus College, Oxford
Conservative Party (UK) MPs for Welsh constituencies
UK MPs 1852–1857
UK MPs 1857–1859
UK MPs 1859–1865
Welsh antiquarians
Members of the Cambrian Archaeological Association
High Sheriffs of Merionethshire
People educated at Westminster School, London
19th-century Welsh historians